(born February 20, 1963 in Yamagata Prefecture) is a Japanese actor and director.

Stunt/Suit Actor Roles

Super Sentai Series
 Dai Sentai Goggle V  (1982-1983) - Spotmen
 Kagaku Sentai Dynaman (1983-1984) - Tail Soldiers  
 Choudenshi Bioman (1984-1985) - Green Two, Zyuoh, Aquaiger
 Dengeki Sentai Changeman (1985-1986) - Space Beast Warriors,  Hidrer Soldiers
 Choushinsei Flashman  (1986-1987) - Green Flash
 Hikari Sentai Maskman (1987-1988) - Black Mask
 Choujuu Sentai Liveman (1988-1989) - Black Bison
 Kousoku Sentai Turboranger (1989-1990) - Black Turbo, Turbo Rugger
 Chikyu Sentai Fiveman (1990-1991) - Five Blue
Chōjin Sentai Jetman (1991-1992) - Yellow Owl
 Kyōryū Sentai Zyuranger (1992–1993) - Tiger Ranger
 Gosei Sentai Dairanger (1993–1994) - Kirinranger
 Ninja Sentai Kakuranger (1994–1995) - Ninja Yellow
 Denji Sentai Megaranger (1997–1998) - Neji Blue
 Seijuu Sentai Gingaman (1998-1999) - Battobas
 Hyakujuu Sentai Gaoranger (2001-2002) - Gao Yellow
 Ninpu Sentai Hurricaneger (2002) - Kuroko Robot
 Juken Sentai Gekiranger (2007) - Tabu

Kamen Rider Series
Kamen Rider Agito (2001) - El Lord

Metal Heroes Series
Jikuu Senshi Spielban (1986) - Warler combat machine man
Choujinki Metalder (1987-1988) - Dranger
Juukou B-Fighter (1995-1996) - Schwartz
B-Fighter Kabuto (1996-1997) - Beezack

Action Director

Super Sentai Series
Ninpu Sentai Hurricaneger (2002-2003)
Bakuryuu Sentai Abaranger (2003-2004)
Tokusou Sentai Dekaranger (2004-2005)
Mahou Sentai Magiranger (2005-2006)
GoGo Sentai Boukenger (2006-2007)
Juken Sentai Gekiranger (2007-2008) 
Engine Sentai Go-Onger (2008-2009)
Samurai Sentai Shinkenger (2009-2010)
Tensou Sentai Goseiger (2010-2011)
Kaizoku Sentai Gokaiger (2011-2012)

Kamen Rider Series
Kamen Rider Wizard (2012-2013)
Kamen Rider Gaim (2013-2014)

Non-Suit Roles
Dengeki Sentai Changeman (1985) - KitagawaNinja Sentai Kakuranger (1994) - GhostNinja Sentai Kakuranger: The Movie (1994) - Younger Hitotsume KozouJuukou B-Fighter (1995) - Heavysnake, Bagma-Virus, Maskuder (voices)B-Fighter Kabuto - Staff MemberKamen Rider Kuuga'' (2000) - Makuhari

References

External links
 

1963 births
Japanese male film actors
Living people